The Gymcrack was a greyhound competition held at initially Hackney Wick Stadium, Hall Green Stadium and later Kinsley Greyhound Stadium.

History
Initially run at Hackney Wick Stadium in 1994 the race was discontinued in the mid 1996, despite winners such as Moral Standards, Night Trooper and Staplers Jo. 

It was re-introduced in 2000 at Hall Green Stadium but switched to Kinsley in 2011.

The competition has grown in stature since 2000 and is competed for by puppies (greyhounds over 15 months old but under two years of age). In 2017, the race was won by an Irish entry for the first time  but the 2019 event was in danger of being cancelled following problems over securing a sponsor.

The event was last held in 2018, when Brinkleys Poet broke the Kinsley track record winning the final.

Past winners

Venues & Distances 
1994-1994 (Hackney, 484m)
1995-1995 (Hackney, 442m)
1996-1996 (Hackney, 480m)
2000-2010 (Hall Green, 480m)
2011-2018 (Kinsley, 462m)

Sponsors
2005-2009 Skybet
2010-2010 Newton Abbot Racecourse
2011-2018 Betfred

References

External links
British Greyhound Racing Board

Greyhound racing competitions in the United Kingdom
Sport in West Yorkshire
Recurring sporting events established in 1994
Sports competitions in Birmingham, West Midlands
1994 establishments in England